Walter Gerald "Joe" Evans (20 April 1920 – 17 August 2013) was an Australian rules footballer who played with Essendon in the Victorian Football League (VFL). A half forward from Brunswick City, Joe played 21 games between 1940 and 1942 before his football career was ended by a bad knee injury.

Notes

External links 

1920 births
2013 deaths
Australian rules footballers from Melbourne
Essendon Football Club players
People from West Melbourne, Victoria